The Expressway Authority of Thailand (EXAT) is a state enterprise under the Ministry of Transport. It was founded in 1972, and operates Thailand's expressway ( thang phiset) system, which refers to (usually  elevated) high-capacity controlled-access highways serving the Greater Bangkok area and some nearby provinces.

EXAT does not operate the separate Thai motorway network, which covers intercity controlled-access highways.

Expressway system

In 2013 the system served 594 million cars.

The constituent expressway systems are (in order of completion): 
 Chaloem Maha Nakhon Expressway (first stage Expressway System)
 Si Rat Expressway (second stage Expressway System)
 Chalong Rat Expressway (Ramindra – At Narong Expressway)
 Burapha Withi Expressway (Bang Na Expressway)
 Udon Ratthaya Expressway (Bang Pa-in – Pak Kret Expressway)
 Third stage expressway System, S1 section (At Narong - Bang Na)
 Bang Phli–Suk Sawat Expressway (South Kanchanaphisek ring road)
 Ramindra–Outer Ring Road Expressway
 Si Rat–Outer Ring Road Expressway

Financials
Fiscal year 2015 (year ending 30 September 2015) revenues were 16,060 million baht on total assets of 180,696 million baht. It employed 4,701 regular and 625 temporary employees in FY2015. EXAT's top seven executives were remunerated 12.9 million baht total in FY2015.

See also
Controlled-access highways in Thailand

References

External links
 Expressway Authority of Thailand (EXAT)
 Ministry of Transport (Thailand)

State enterprises of Thailand
Expressways in Thailand (MOT)
Road authorities